Senator Seeley may refer to:

Ebenezer Seeley (1793–1866), Connecticut State Senate
John Seeley (Steuben County, NY) (1872–1932), New York State Senate

See also
Morris Seely (1795–1847), Ohio State Senate
Gilbert T. Seelye (1877–1962), New York State Senate